The open cabildo (Spanish: cabildo abierto) is a traditional Hispanic American political action for convening citizens to make important decisions. It is comparable to the North American town hall meeting.

History

Colonial period
The open cabildo was a special mode of assembly of the inhabitants of Spanish American cities during the colonial period, in cases of emergencies or disasters. Usually, the colonial cities were governed by a cabildo or an ayuntamiento, a municipal council in which most of the officers were appointed by the authorities. In cases of emergency, the cabildo could convene the heads of household (vecinos) in an "open" cabildo.

At the beginning of the Spanish American wars of independence open cabildos played a decisive role were the path by revolutionary movements, acting as organs of popular participation, were able to remove the colonial authorities and establish new revolutionary governments.

Modern politics

In modern times, some Latin American countries have used the name "open cabildos" for public assemblies convened by municipal governments to decide local matters of public importance. The term is sometimes used for present-day public meetings to make decisions. Some modern versions, while using the historically evocative name, can be more similar to an outdoor rally.

In Venezuela, the open cabildo is one part of a set of provisions required to preserve democracy. Article 70 of the nation's Constitution says that "there [must be] methods for the people to exercise their sovereignty in politics [including] the open forum and assembly of citizens whose decisions will be binding". Because the legally binding vote is tied to the open cabildo, the Constitution may be interpreted to say that the forum can still have the power of a political referendum.

See also
 Cabildo
 Spanish colonization of the Americas

References

Spanish colonization of the Americas
Legal history of Spain
Spanish American wars of independence
Protest tactics
Politics of South America